Marijan Novak (born 2 October 1947) is a retired Croatian football forward who is mainly known for his time at Dinamo Zagreb (1964–1972) and his contribution to the club's triumph in the 1966–67 Inter-Cities Fairs Cup.

Club career
Novak spent his youth years at NK Trešnjevka, before signing for Dinamo Zagreb in 1964. He played for Dinamo until 1972 and helped the club win the Inter-Cities Fairs Cup in 1967 and Yugoslav Cup in 1969. Although the club never won the Yugoslav First League during his time there, Dinamo finished as league runners-up three times (1966, 1967, 1969) as well as finishing as cup runners-up twice (1966 and 1972). Overall, Novak scored a total of 118 goals in 312 appearances during his time at Dinamo.

After leaving Dinamo in late 1972 he joined German second-level side VfR Heilbronn where he stayed for a single season before moving to another German second level outfit TSV 1860 München in 1973. After two seasons at Munich and only 3 goals from 19 appearances, Novak retired in 1975, aged only 28.

International career
Following Dinamo's successful Inter-Cities Fairs Cup campaign, Novak was also called up and appeared for Yugoslavia in a friendly away against the Netherlands on 1 November 1967, but never appeared for the national team again.

Honours
Yugoslav Cup
Winner (1): 1969
Runner-up (1): 1966, 1972
Yugoslav First League
Runner-up (1): 1966, 1967, 1969
Inter-Cities Fairs Cup
Winner (1): 1967

References

External links
 
 Serbian national football team website 

1947 births
Living people
Footballers from Zagreb
Association football forwards
Yugoslav footballers
Yugoslavia international footballers
Mediterranean Games gold medalists for Yugoslavia
Competitors at the 1971 Mediterranean Games
Mediterranean Games medalists in football
GNK Dinamo Zagreb players
VfR Heilbronn players
TSV 1860 Munich players
Yugoslav First League players
Regionalliga players
Yugoslav expatriate footballers
Expatriate footballers in West Germany
Yugoslav expatriate sportspeople in West Germany